The 1967–68 NHL season was the 51st season of the National Hockey League. The league expanded to 12 teams, putting the new six in the newly created West Division, while the "Original Six" were all placed in the newly created East Division. The regular season schedule was expanded to 74 games per team. The Montreal Canadiens won the Stanley Cup against the new St. Louis Blues, in four games.

League business
This season saw the NHL expand from the "original six" teams by adding six new franchises, including the St. Louis Blues, California Seals, Philadelphia Flyers, Minnesota North Stars, Pittsburgh Penguins, and Los Angeles Kings. On December 8, 1967, the California Seals were renamed the Oakland Seals before being renamed again to the California Golden Seals in 1970. As a result of the expansion, the League reorganized its teams into two divisions, placing the Original Six teams into the East Division and the expansion franchises into the West Division. The NHL, furthermore, increased its regular season schedule from 70 to 74 games per team  with each team playing 50 games against opponents within its own division (10 against each divisional opponent) and 24 games with teams in the opposite division (4 games per opponent). The newly created Clarence S. Campbell Bowl was awarded to the team that finished first in the West Division during the regular season, the Prince of Wales Trophy was likewise awarded the East Division first-place team. A new format for the playoffs would also be introduced which would see the top four teams in each division qualify for the post-season with the first and third and the second and fourth place teams in each respective division pairing off in a divisional semi-final series. The winners of the latter would then compete in their respective divisional final series and a berth in the Stanley Cup finals. All series would be best-of-seven contests.

This season, the NHL also added a new player award called the Bill Masterton Memorial Trophy, named in honour of Bill Masterton who died on January 15, 1968, after sustaining an injury during a game (the first time an NHL player had ever died directly as a result of an on-ice injury).

The minimum age of players subject to amateur draft was changed to 20.

There were a large number of holdouts this year. Three New York Ranger players, including Rod Gilbert, Arnie Brown and Orland Kurtenbach were fined $500 by their team. However, Ed Van Impe of the Flyers refused to sign his contract, followed by Earl Ingarfield and Al MacNeil also refused to sign, then Tim Horton of Toronto, Norm Ullman of Detroit and Kenny Wharram and Stan Mikita of Chicago. Led by Alan Eagleson, the new National Hockey League Players' Association was up and running.

Regular season

Highlights
On October 11, 1967, Jean Beliveau scored his 400th career goal on goaltender Hank Bassen of the Pittsburgh Penguins. This also happened to be the first game in Penguins franchise history.

The Canadiens stumbled out of the gate. In their first west coast road trip, the Seals beat them 2–1 and the Kings beat them 4–2. The Habs lost quite a few more and were in last place by December. But by January, Jean Beliveau began to score and others were inspired also. The Habs got very hot, winning 12 consecutive games and then put together 10 more wins to take the East Division lead. Paced by Gump Worsley, who had 6 shutouts and a 1.98 goals against average and backstopped the team to the fewest goals allowed in the league, managed to keep first place thereafter. Worsley, for the first time, made the first all-star team.

On February 24, 1968, Rogie Vachon of Montreal was the victim of four goals by Rod Gilbert, who set an NHL record with 16 shots on goal.

Eddie Giacomin again led the league with 8 shutouts, and led the Rangers to second place, bolstered by Jean Ratelle's emergence into stardom.

Boston obtained Phil Esposito, Ken Hodge and Fred Stanfield in a blockbuster trade with Chicago. This trade, as shown over time, heavily favored the Bruins. This, coinciding with the rise of Bobby Orr, led to an improvement in Boston's play, and the Bruins led the league in scoring behind Esposito's 84 points and made the playoffs for the first time in nearly a decade. Though he missed action with a knee injury, Orr still won the Norris Trophy as the league's top defenceman.

By contrast, the Chicago Black Hawks fell into a tailspin, and despite the scoring heroics of Bobby Hull and Stan Mikita, were hard pressed to make the playoffs. Mediocre team defence and goaltending was the culprit.

Roger Crozier felt the strain of goaltending and walked out on Detroit. He came back, but the Red Wings finished last anyway, despite a potent offense led by Gordie Howe, Alex Delvecchio and Norm Ullman. Even a late season trade of Ullman and Paul Henderson for Toronto star Frank Mahovlich and future Blues star Garry Unger was too little, too late. However, on March 24, 1968, Mahovlich became only the 11th player to score 300 goals as he scored both his 300th and 301st goals in a 5–3 win over the Boston Bruins.

Meanwhile, the defending Cup champion Toronto Maple Leafs, still steady on defence in front of elder statesman Johnny Bower and backup Bruce Gamble, had numerous problems. Mahovlich spent time in hospital with a nervous breakdown, and the season was marred by contract disputes and tension with the high-strung coach, Punch Imlach. A late season charge failed to win a playoff berth.

In the West Division, the Philadelphia Flyers became the first regular season champion of the expansion clubs. While their offense was poor (career minor-league Leon Rochefort led the team with just 21 goals), ex-Bruins' goaltenders Bernie Parent and Doug Favell showed surprising form. Behind such hardnosed players as Gary Dornhoefer, Ed Van Impe, Larry Zeidel and Forbes Kennedy, the team showed the first glimmers of the "Broad Street Bullies" of future years.

The Los Angeles Kings were a team that writers predicted to finish last in the new West Division. Owner Jack Kent Cooke had purchased the American Hockey League's Springfield Indians for $1 million to bolster the Kings roster. Surprisingly, the Kings finished second, just one point out of first. Bill Flett scored 26 goals, while Eddie Joyal scored 23 goals, adding 34 assists for 57 points and was the second leading scorer in the West Division. Among the expansion teams, the Kings had the best record against the established teams, going 10–12–2 vs. the Eastern Division.

Oakland, predicted to finish first, fell far short of the mark, amidst poor attendance. Defenceman Kent Douglas, a former Calder Memorial Trophy winner, played far below expected form and was traded to Detroit for Ted Hampson and defenceman Bert Marshall. The Seals finished last in the West Division.

Glenn Hall may have been deemed too old by the Black Hawks, which left him unprotected in the expansion draft, but not for the St. Louis Blues, who rode his five shutouts to a third-place finish. A surprising benefit was their leading scorer, previously unheralded Red Berenson (with only 45 points in 185 previous NHL games) who exploded into stardom, more than doubling his career total in only 55 games.

By contrast, the Pittsburgh Penguins finished fifth, led by former Ranger star Andy Bathgate. Behind an elderly roster—nine of their top ten scorers and both of their goaltenders were over thirty—they could neither muster much offense nor defence.

The Minnesota North Stars had their bright moments despite finishing fourth in the West Division. On December 30, 1967, Bill Masterton and Wayne Connelly each scored goals in a 5–4 upset win over the Boston Bruins. On January 10, Connelly—who would finish the season with 35 goals to lead his team and the West Division—had a hat trick in a 6–4 win over the West Division power, the Philadelphia Flyers and Masterton was the architect on all three goals.

Tragedy struck the league on January 13, 1968. In a game at the Metropolitan Sports Center in Bloomington, Minnesota, the Oakland Seals were in town to play the North Stars and Bill Masterton led a rush into the Oakland zone. Two defencemen, Larry Cahan and Ron Harris braced for the old fashioned sandwich check and as Masterton fired the puck into the Seals zone, the two hit Masterton hard but cleanly. Masterton flipped backwards and hit his head on the ice. He was removed to a Minneapolis hospital where doctors were prevented from doing surgery by the seriousness of the head injury. Early on the morning of January 15, 1968, Bill Masterton died. He was the first -- and as of 2022, the only -- player to die as the direct result of injuries suffered in an NHL game, the only such incident in a senior game since 1907.

Final standings
Note: GP = Games played, W = Wins, L = Losses, T = Ties, Pts = Points, GF = Goals for, GA = Goals against, PIM = Penalties in minutes

Note: Teams that qualified for the playoffs are highlighted in bold

Playoffs

All series but Bruins-Canadiens had a game postponed after the Assassination of Martin Luther King, Jr. on April 4.

Playoff bracket

Quarterfinals

The Canadiens drew the third-place Boston Bruins in the first round. The Bruins, making their first appearance in the playoffs since 1959, were swept in four games. In the other East series, the second-place Rangers faced off against the fourth-place Chicago Black Hawks. The Black Hawks, led by Bobby Hull and Stan Mikita defeated the Rangers in six to set up a Montreal-Chicago East Division showdown. The Black Hawks could not provide another upset, and lost to the Canadiens in five games, giving Montreal their only defeat of the playoffs.

In the West, all four teams played their first playoff series. The first-place Philadelphia Flyers lost their first-ever playoff series to the Blues, led by goaltender Glenn Hall and coached by future Hall of Fame coach Scotty Bowman in seven games, while the second-place Los Angeles Kings lost to the fourth-place Minnesota North Stars in seven games. The Blues would defeat the North Stars in seven games to advance to their first final.

(E1) Montreal Canadiens vs. (E3) Boston Bruins

(E2) New York Rangers vs. (E4) Chicago Black Hawks

(W1) Philadelphia Flyers vs. (W3) St. Louis Blues

(W2) Los Angeles Kings vs. (W4) Minnesota North Stars

Semifinals

(E1) Montreal Canadiens vs. (E4) Chicago Black Hawks

(W3) St. Louis Blues vs. (W4) Minnesota North Stars

Stanley Cup Finals

The Blues faced the Canadiens for the Stanley Cup. Blues coach Bowman, a long-time member of the Canadiens organization was unable to spur the Blues to an upset, but they made it a hard-fought series, with each game being decided by one goal and two going to overtime. However, the Canadiens, led by Jean Beliveau and Henri Richard, were not to be denied and swept the series in four games. Despite this, the exceptional performance of the heavy underdog Blues impressed and surprised most hockey fans who were expecting an utter blowout by the Canadiens, to the point that their goaltender Glenn Hall, who helped lead the team to the Cup Finals, was named the MVP of the playoffs.

Awards

All-Star teams

Player statistics

Scoring leaders
Note: GP = Games played; G Goals; A = Assists; Pts = Points; PIM = Penalty minutes

Source: NHL.

Leading goaltenders

Note: GP = Games played; Min = Minutes played; GA = Goals against; GAA = Goals against average; W = Wins; L = Losses; T = Ties; SO = Shutouts

Other statistics
The NHL began tracking the plus-minus statistic this season. It measures the difference between the number of goals scored by a player's team while a player is on the ice against the number of goals scored by the opposing team. Power play goals do not count toward the statistic; it does include short-handed goals scored by the opposing team during power plays.

 Plus-Minus leader: Dallas Smith, Boston Bruins

Coaches

East
Boston Bruins: Harry Sinden
Chicago Black Hawks: Billy Reay
Detroit Red Wings: Sid Abel
Montreal Canadiens: Toe Blake
New York Rangers: Emile Francis
Toronto Maple Leafs: Punch Imlach

West
Los Angeles Kings: Red Kelly
Minnesota North Stars: Wren Blair
Oakland Seals: Bert Olmstead and Gord Fashoway
Philadelphia Flyers: Keith Allen
Pittsburgh Penguins: George "Red" Sullivan
St. Louis Blues: Lynn Patrick and Scotty Bowman

Debuts
The following is a list of notable players who played their first NHL game in 1967–68 (listed with their first team, asterisk(*) marks debut in playoffs):
Bobby Schmautz, Chicago Black Hawks
Bill White, Los Angeles Kings
Walt McKechnie, Minnesota North Stars
Mickey Redmond, Montreal Canadiens
Jacques Lemaire, Montreal Canadiens
Garry Monahan, Montreal Canadiens
Walt Tkaczuk, New York Rangers
Dennis Hextall*, New York Rangers
Simon Nolet, Philadelphia Flyers
Barclay Plager, St. Louis Blues
Garry Unger, Toronto Maple Leafs

Last games
The following is a list of notable players who played their last game in the NHL in 1967–68 (listed with their last team):
Bill Masterton, Minnesota North Stars
Bronco Horvath, Minnesota North Stars
Bernie Geoffrion, New York Rangers
Dickie Moore, St. Louis Blues
Don McKenney, St. Louis Blues

See also 
 1967–68 NHL transactions
 1967 NHL Expansion
 List of Stanley Cup champions
 1967 NHL Amateur Draft
 1967 NHL Expansion Draft
 21st National Hockey League All-Star Game
 National Hockey League All-Star Game
 Ice hockey at the 1968 Winter Olympics
 1967 in sports
 1968 in sports

References
 
 
 
 
 

Notes

External links
Hockey Database
NHL.com

 
1967–68 in American ice hockey by league
1967–68 in Canadian ice hockey by league